Our Shining Moment is a 1991 television family drama film  directed  by Mark Tinker and starring  Cindy Pickett, Max Gail and Don Ameche.  It was intended as a pilot for a series which was never produced. It was broadcast on NBC on June 2, 1991.

Premise
In 1963, a father and his teenage son forge a bond when the son is expelled from school and sees his secretly out-of-work father in the park.

Cast 
  Cindy Pickett as Betty McGuire
  Max Gail as John McGuire Jr.
  Jonathan Brandis as Michael 'Scooter' McGuire
  Seth Green as Wheels
   LuAnne Ponce as Maureen McGuire
  Don Ameche as John 'Papa' McGuire Sr.
  Shawn Levy as J.J.  
  Alvin Sanders as Mr. Rahill 
  Bill Dow as Barney 
   Sonia Banman as Lois Jessel
  Alec Burden as Father Hogan 
  Jack Black as a teenage boy

References

External links

1991 drama films
1991 television films
1991 films
Television pilots not picked up as a series
Television films as pilots
Films set in 1963
NBC original programming
NBC network original films
Disney television films
American drama television films
1990s English-language films
1990s American films
English-language drama films